Maniraptoromorpha is a clade of coelurosaurian theropod dinosaurs that includes taxa such as Ornitholestes, Compsognathidae and Maniraptoriformes. There have been several phylogenetic analyses that have shown support in the grouping of Maniraptoriformes with at least the aforementioned Ornitholestes. This group was named by Andrea Cau, who defined it as the "most inclusive clade containing Vultur gryphus Linnaeus, 1758, and excluding Tyrannosaurus rex Osborn, 1905."

This group of coelurosaurs according to Cau (2018) has the following synapomorphies:
Keel or carinae in the postaxial cervical  centra, absence of hyposphene-hypantra in caudal  vertebrae  (reversal  to  the  plesiomorphic theropodan condition), a prominent dorsomedial process on  the  semilunate  carpal, a  convex  ventral  margin  of  the pubic foot, a subrectangular distal end of tibia and a sulcus along the posterior margin of the proximal end of fibula.

In 2019 Hendrickx et al. established the maniraptoromorph subclade Neocoelurosauria as a branch-based node for the clade containing Maniraptoriformes and Compsognathidae.

References

Tyrannoraptora
Late Jurassic dinosaurs
Cretaceous dinosaurs
Cenozoic dinosaurs
Extant Middle Jurassic first appearances